Vladislav Đukić (also transliterated Djukić; born 7 September 1962) is a retired Serbian football striker.

International career
He made his debut for Yugoslavia against West Germany in a friendly 1–1 draw on 4 June 1988. He played his next match two months later scoring the second goal against Switzerland. The friendly match finished 2-0 for Yugoslavia and was played on 24 August 1988.

Coaching career
1997-2000 Napredak Gračac, Kraljevo Hajduk
2001      Napredak Kruševac
2002      Goč Vrnjačka Banja
2002-2003 Napredak Kruševac
2004-2005 Omladinac Novo Selo
2006-2007 Goč Vrnjačka Banja
2008-2009 Radnički Niš
2011      Sloga Kraljevo (youth)

References

External links
 
 
 
 Interview for Crno-bela nostalgija

1962 births
Living people
People from Vrnjačka Banja
Serbian footballers
Yugoslav expatriate footballers
Serbian football managers
Yugoslav footballers
Yugoslavia international footballers
FK Sloga Kraljevo players
FK Napredak Kruševac players
FC Prishtina players
FK Partizan players
A.C. Cesena players
Yugoslav First League players
Serie A players
Expatriate footballers in Italy
Yugoslav expatriate sportspeople in Italy
Association football forwards
Olympic footballers of Yugoslavia
Footballers at the 1988 Summer Olympics
FK Napredak Kruševac managers